Caularthron Raf. (1837), abbreviated Cau. in the horticultural trade, is a genus of orchids with 4 species. They are epiphytic orchids with specialized hollow pseudobulbs that house ants. The genus is exclusively found in the tropical regions of southern Mexico, Central America, the West Indies, and northern South America.

List of species 
Species accepted as of May 2014:

References

Orchids of Central America
Orchids of Belize
Laeliinae genera
Epiphytic orchids
Laeliinae
Taxa named by Constantine Samuel Rafinesque